The 1990 Prix de l'Arc de Triomphe was a horse race held at Longchamp on Sunday 7 October 1990. It was the 69th running of the Prix de l'Arc de Triomphe.

The winner was Saumarez, a three-year-old colt trained in France by Nicolas Clément. The winning jockey was Gérald Mossé.

Race details
 Sponsor: CIGA Hotels
 Purse: 8,500,000 F; First prize: 5,000,000 F
 Going: Good
 Distance: 2,400 metres
 Number of runners: 21
 Winner's time: 2m 29.8s

Full result

Winner's details
Further details of the winner, Saumarez.
 Sex: Colt
 Foaled: 28 March 1987
 Country: Great Britain
 Sire: Rainbow Quest; Dam: Fiesta Fun (Welsh Pageant)
 Owners: Bruce McNall and Wayne Gretzky
 Breeder: Elizabeth Longton

References

External links
 Colour Chart – Arc 1990

Prix de l'Arc de Triomphe
 1990
1990 in Paris
October 1990 sports events in Europe